Douglas Watt may refer to:

Douglas Watt (critic) (1914–2009), critic for the New York Daily News
Douglas Watt (politician) (1914–1985), politician in Manitoba, Canada
Douglas Watt (psychologist) (born 1950), American neuropsychologist

See also
Robert Watt (born 1945), also known as Robert Douglas Watt, Canadian museum curator
Willie Watt (footballer, born 1946), also known as William Douglas Watt, Scottish footballer